The name Star Search may refer to:

 Star Search, American talent television series
 Star Search (Singaporean TV series), similar Singaporean TV series:
 Star Search (Singaporean season 8)
 Star Search (Singaporean season 9)
 Star Search (Singaporean season 10)
 Star Search (Singaporean season 11)
 Starsearch, similar Samoan television series broadcast by Samoa Broadcasting Corporation